Elections for the Massachusetts Governor's Council were held on November 7, 2006. Candidates from the Democratic Party were elected or re-elected to all eight districts.

The Governor's Council (also known as the Executive Council) of Massachusetts is a popularly elected board which must, among its duties, approve or disapprove of the governor's judicial nominations, pardons, and commutations.  The councillors are elected every two years from eight councillor districts across the Commonwealth.  The lieutenant governor of Massachusetts serves as an ex officio member. The 2006 Massachusetts Gubernatorial election was held on the same date as the Council election, as well as other State and Federal elections.

Election results

District One
For this election, District One comprised all of Barnstable, Dukes, Nantucket Counties and portions of Bristol and Plymouth.

District Two
For this election, District Two comprised portions of Bristol, Middlesex, Norfolk, Plymouth, and Suffolk Counties.

District Three
District Three comprised portions of Middlesex, Norfolk, Suffolk, and Worcester Counties.

District Four
District Four comprised portions of Bristol, Norfolk, Plymouth  and Suffolk Counties.

District Five
District Five comprised portions of  Essex, and Middlesex Counties.

 District 6  (Portions of Essex, and Middlesex, and Suffolk Counties)
 Democratic Incumbent Michael J. Callahan: 143,221
 Republican Candidate William Barabino: 44,893
 Unenrolled Candidate Rosemary A. Macero: 19,193
 Unenrolled Candidate Ted Sarandis former WEEI talk show host: 17,795

 District 7 (Portions of Franklin, Hampden, Hampshire, Middlesex, Norfolk, and Worcester Counties)
 Democratic Incumbent Dennis P. McManus - Not running for re-election
 Democratic Candidate Brian J. Buckley - Lost in primary election
 Democratic Candidate Daniel S. O'Connor - Lost in primary election
 Democratic Candidate Thomas J. Foley - Party nominee: 201,541
 Democratic Candidate Brian D'Andrea - Lost in primary election
 Democratic Candidate[John Burke - Lost in primary election

 District 8 (All of Berkshire, and portions of Franklin, Hampden, and Hampshire Counties)
 Democratic Incumbent Peter Vickery - Lost in Primary election
 Democratic Candidate Thomas Merrigan: 133,601
 Republican Candidate Michael Franco: 48,993
 Unenrolled Candidate Michael Kogut: 45,544
 Democratic Challenger Rinaldo Del Gallo III (withdrew before ballot)

References

External links
 Official site via Mass.gov
Massachusetts Office of Campaign and Political Finance
Official results

Governor's Council